Eduard Sievers developed a theory of the meter of Anglo-Saxon alliterative verse.  This most likely would have been the theory of Anglo-Saxon prosody that Ezra Pound would have been familiar with.  

A line of Anglo-Saxon verse is made up of two half-lines.  Each of these half-lines contains two main stresses (or 'lifts'). Sievers categorized three basic types of half-line that were used.  Here a stressed syllable is represented by the symbol '/' and an unstressed syllable by the symbol 'x'.

He also noted that three possible types of half-line were not used:
/ x x /
/ / x x 
x x / /

However the first two of these can be used if one of the 'dips' is changed into a half-stress (or 'half lift' ... notated here 'x́'):

References
Brooke-Rose, Christine, A ZBC of Ezra Pound, Faber and Faber, 1971.  (page 88)

Poetic rhythm
Old English poetry